Latavius Rashard Murray (born January 18, 1990) is an American football running back who is a free agent. He played college football at UCF and was drafted by the Oakland Raiders in the sixth round of the 2013 NFL Draft. He was also a member of the Minnesota Vikings, New Orleans Saints, and Baltimore Ravens.

Early years
Born in Titusville, Florida, Murray attended Onondaga Central High School in Onondaga, New York, where he was a three-sport athlete in football, basketball, and track. In football, Murray was All-league and All-Central New York selection in three straight seasons. In his sophomore year, he was third-team All-state honoree following a 1,609-yard, 14-touchdown season. He garnered first-team All-state honors as a junior, rushing for 2,030 yards and 30 touchdowns. In his final year, he was named the 2007 Gatorade Football Player of the Year in the state of New York after rushing for 2,194 yards with 28 touchdowns on offense, while also recording 78 tackles, three forced fumbles and two interceptions on defense. He also was named as the Class D Player of the Year and First-team All-State by the NYSSWA.

Regarded as a three-star recruit, Murray was ranked as the No. 5 prospect in the state of New York by Rivals.com, No. 6 according to Scout.com. He chose UCF over scholarship offers from Boston College, Maryland, and Syracuse, among others.

College career
Murray played college football at the University of Central Florida. 

He made his collegiate debut against South Carolina State and had 43 rushing yards and two touchdowns. In his freshman season, he finished with 132 rushing yards and three rushing touchdowns. Murray tore his ACL during the offseason after his freshman year while playing basketball. 

After redshirting in 2009, he returned to the Knights' backfield in 2010. On November 20, against Tulane, he had his best game of the season with 146 rushing yards and a touchdown. On December 4, against SMU, he finished with 94 rushing yards and 21 receiving yards in a game with his first collegiate receiving touchdown. In his redshirt sophomore season, he was named Conference USA Championship MVP and also was named AutoZone Liberty Bowl MVP for his performance against Georgia in which he rushed for 104 yards and scored the game-winning touchdown. Overall, in the 2010 season, he finished with 637 rushing yards, 11 rushing touchdowns, five receptions, 47 receiving yards, and one receiving touchdown. 

He started his junior season with 36 rushing yards and two rushing touchdowns against Charleston Southern. In the next game against Boston College, he had 72 rushing yards and a touchdown. He was mostly held in check up to the end of the regular season. On November 19, against East Carolina, he had 87 rushing yards and a touchdown. In the last game of the season against UTEP, he had a season-high 233 rushing yards with two rushing touchdowns. Following the conclusion of his junior season, he was selected as the team's MVP and offensive player of the year. 

In his senior season, he was an All-C-USA First-team selection and was named to Phil Steele's All-C-USA First-team. He was named to the College Football Performance Awards All-Purpose Trophy Watch List and also was selected to the College Football Performance Awards Special Teams Watch List. He was named to the Doak Walker Award Watch List. On August 30, 2012, he started the season with 108 rushing yards and a touchdown against Akron. On October 20, he started a four-game stretch where he recorded 192 yards and two touchdowns, 156 yards and three touchdowns, 155 yards and two touchdowns, and 117 rushing yards and a rushing touchdown in those games. Overall, in his last season with the Knights, he had 1,106 rushing yards, 15 rushing touchdowns, 27 receptions, 231 receiving yards, and four receiving touchdowns. He finished his college career with a total of 2,424 rushing yards, 37 rushing touchdowns, 50 receptions, 524 receiving yards and 6 receiving touchdowns.

College statistics

Professional career
Murray was regarded as a sixth to seventh round selection according to CBSSports.com.

Murray was not invited to the NFL Combine, but garnered much attention with an impressive performance at Central Florida's Pro Day. Murray weighed in at 6-foot-2 5/8 and 223 pounds, ran the 40-yard dash in 4.4 and 4.38 seconds, registered a 10-foot-4 broad jump and a 36-inch vertical jump, ran 4.36 seconds in the short shuttle and 6.81 seconds in the 3-cone.

Oakland Raiders

2013 season
Murray was selected by the Oakland Raiders with the 181st overall pick in the sixth round of the 2013 NFL Draft. He was the 15th running back to be selected in that year's draft. The Raiders signed Murray to a four-year, $2.26 million contract on June 6, 2013. It also included $106,200 guaranteed and a signing bonus of $106,200.

On August 27, 2013, before the start of the regular season, Murray was placed on injured reserve, ending his rookie season before it started.

2014 season
After being third on the depth chart for the first half of the season behind veterans Darren McFadden and Maurice Jones-Drew, the Raiders turned to Murray in Week 11 to provide a spark after ineffectiveness by McFadden and Jones-Drew all year. He responded by totaling 59 yards on seven carries against the San Diego Chargers. On November 20, 2014, he finished with four carries for 112 rushing yards and two rushing touchdowns, marking his first career touchdown against the Kansas City Chiefs. It also marked the first rushing touchdown the Chiefs defense allowed all season and his 90-yard touchdown marked the longest rush for the Raiders that year. The solid performance by Murray contributed to the Raiders' first victory of the 2014 season. After having success on his first three attempts, he suffered a concussion on his fourth carry and was taken out of the game.

Murray returned to play against the San Francisco 49ers in Week 14 and finished the 24–13 victory with 23 carries for 76 rushing yards. In the next game, he earned his first NFL start against the Chiefs and had 12 rushing attempts for 59 yards. In Week 16, he gained 86 yards on 16 carries and had his second consecutive start against the Buffalo Bills. Murray remained the starting running back for the last three games of the season and finished his first year with 82 carries, 424 rushing yards, and two rushing touchdowns in 15 games.

2015 season
Murray entered the season as the Raiders' number one tailback and was expected by the Raiders to receive the majority of the carries after the retirement of Maurice Jones-Drew and the departure of Darren McFadden. As expected, he began the season as the Raiders' starting running back and had 11 attempts for 44 yards in the season-opening 33–13 loss to the Cincinnati Bengals. Two weeks later, Murray ran for a career-high 139 yards and a touchdown on 26 carries in a 27–20 win over the Cleveland Browns. On November 1, against the New York Jets, he had 113 rushing yards in the 34–20 victory.

On Christmas Eve, Murray became the first Raider to reach the 1,000-yard mark rushing, since Darren McFadden did in 2010. His performance of 79 yards on 19 carries, 38 yards on five receptions and a rushing touchdown, helped edge a victory over the San Diego Chargers with a final score of 23–20 in overtime.

Overall, Murray finished the 2015 season with 1,066 rushing yards and six touchdowns along with 41 receptions for 232 yards.

2016 season
Murray started the season off with a rushing touchdown in three straight games against the New Orleans Saints, Atlanta Falcons, and Tennessee Titans. On October 23, against the Jacksonville Jaguars, he had 59 rushing yards and two  touchdowns. On November 6, in a 30–20 victory over the Denver Broncos, he had 114 rushing yards and three touchdowns. In a 38–24 victory over the Buffalo Bills on December 4, he ran for 82 rushing yards and two touchdowns. In a 21–13 loss to the Kansas City Chiefs four days later, he had his third straight game with a rushing touchdown to go along with 103 rushing yards.

Murray finished the regular season playing in 14 games and rushing for 788 yards and a career-high 12 rushing touchdowns.  On January 7, Murray made his playoff debut in the Wild Card Round against the Houston Texans. In the 27–14 road loss, he finished with 39 rushing yards and his first NFL postseason rushing touchdown.

Minnesota Vikings
On March 16, 2017, Murray signed a three-year contract with the Minnesota Vikings. In his opening statement to Vikings fans, Murray stated on his Instagram account: "There wasn't a thought in my mind to try and wear or ask for the No. 28. I have too much respect for Adrian Peterson and so much respect for what he's done and what he means to this organization." During his first press conference as a Viking, Murray announced that he would be wearing #25 in honor of his best friend, who had died in 2016. On March 22, 2017, it was revealed Murray underwent ankle surgery.

2017 season
On September 11, 2017, in the season opener against the New Orleans Saints, Murray had two rushes for six yards in his Vikings debut, ultimately being out-shined by rookie Dalvin Cook. However, Cook tore his ACL in a game against the Detroit Lions, creating an opportunity for Murray. During Week 7 against the Baltimore Ravens, Murray rushed for 117 yards and a touchdown as the Vikings won 24–16. On November 19 against the Los Angeles Rams, he ran for 95 yards and two touchdowns in the 24–7 victory. In the regular season finale against the Chicago Bears, Murray had 111 rushing yards and two touchdowns in the 23–10 victory.

Murray finished his first season with the Vikings with 842 rushing yards and eight touchdowns along with 15 receptions for 103 yards. The Vikings finished atop the NFC North with a 13–3 record and made the playoffs as the #2-seed. In the 29–24 victory over the New Orleans Saints in the Divisional Round, Murray ran for 50 yards and a touchdown. In the 38–7 road loss to the Philadelphia Eagles in the NFC Championship, he was limited to 18 rushing yards on six carries.

2018 season
In the first five games of the 2018 season, Murray totaled 30 carries for 106 yards and nine receptions for 60 yards in a limited role.  In Week 6, against the Arizona Cardinals, he rushed for a career-high 155 yards and a touchdown in a 27–17 victory. In the next game, a 37–17 victory over the New York Jets, he had 69 rushing yards and two touchdowns.

Murray finished the 2018 season with 578 rushing yards and six touchdowns along with 22 receptions for 141 yards.

New Orleans Saints
On March 13, 2019, Murray signed a four-year, $14.4 million contract with the New Orleans Saints.

2019 season
Murray made his Saints debut in the season opener against the Houston Texans, rushing six times for 43 yards and a 30-yard touchdown in the narrow 30–28 victory. During Week 7 against the Chicago Bears, he rushed for 119 yards and two touchdowns in a 36–25 road victory. In the next game against the Arizona Cardinals, Murray rushed 21 times for 102 yards and a touchdown and caught nine passes for 55 yards and a touchdown in the 31–9 win.

Murray finished his first season with the Saints with 637 rushing yards and five touchdowns along with 34 receptions for 235 yards and a touchdown.

2020 season
In Week 4 against the Detroit Lions, Murray rushed for 64 yards and his first two rushing touchdowns of the season during the 35–29 win. In Week 12 against the Denver Broncos, he had 19 carries for 124 rushing yards and two rushing touchdowns in the 31–3 victory. He was placed on the reserve/COVID-19 list by the team on January 2, 2021, and activated on January 6. Overall, Murray finished the 2020 season with 146 carries for 656 rushing yards and four rushing touchdowns to go along with 23 receptions for 176 receiving yards and one receiving touchdown.

The Saints released Murray on September 7, 2021, after he refused to take a pay cut.

Baltimore Ravens
On September 10, 2021, the Baltimore Ravens signed Murray following injuries to J. K. Dobbins, Justice Hill, and Gus Edwards. In his debut against the Las Vegas Raiders, he had 28 yards and a touchdown on 10 carries, but the Ravens lost in overtime 27–33. He was named the starter in Week 4 against the Denver Broncos. In the Week 18 regular season finale against the Pittsburgh Steelers, he had 16 carries for 150 rushing yards and a touchdown in the 16–13 loss. He finished the 2021 season with 119 carries for 501 rushing yards and six rushing touchdowns.

New Orleans Saints (second stint)
Murray was signed to the Saints practice squad on September 13, 2022. He was elevated to the active roster on October 1, 2022.

Denver Broncos
Murray was signed off the Saints practice squad by the Denver Broncos following a season-ending injury to Javonte Williams.

NFL career statistics

Personal life
Murray lives in Florida with his wife and four children. In 2020, he earned a MBA from the Martin J. Whitman School of Management of Syracuse University.

In May of 2022, Murray announced that his non-profit foundation will open a multi-use facility in Nedrow, New York.

References

External links
 
 New Orleans Saints bio
 

1990 births
Living people
American football running backs
Baltimore Ravens players
Denver Broncos players
Minnesota Vikings players
New Orleans Saints players
Oakland Raiders players
People from Onondaga, New York
Players of American football from New York (state)
UCF Knights football players
Unconferenced Pro Bowl players
Martin J. Whitman School of Management alumni